The 2008–09 VMI Keydets basketball team represented the Virginia Military Institute during the 2008-09 NCAA Division I men's basketball season. The Keydets were coached by Duggar Baucom in his 4th year at VMI, and played their home games at Cameron Hall. It was VMI's 5th season in the Big South Conference and the Keydets' 101st season of basketball.

VMI opened the year with an upset over the Kentucky Wildcats in Rupp Arena on November 14, 2008, by a score of 111–103. After losses to Virginia and Jacksonville State to drop their record to 4–2, VMI then went on a ten-game winning streak and won their first six conference games before falling to Liberty 91–80, in what was the first sellout in the 27-year history of Cameron Hall.

After finishing the regular season with a 22–7 mark, VMI cruised through their first two Big South tournament games, beating Coastal Carolina 96–76 in the quarterfinals and besting Liberty 78–58 in the semifinals. The Keydets ultimately fell to Radford 108–94 in the Big South Championship game, ending their season at 24–8. The 24 wins in a season were the school's second-most all-time, trailing only the 1976–77 team who 26 wins en route to a Sweet 16 appearance.

Roster

Schedule

|-
!colspan=9| Regular season

|-
!colspan=9| 2009 Big South Conference men's basketball tournament

References

VMI Keydets basketball seasons
Vmi
VMI Keydets basketball team
VMI Keydets basketball team